Marocaine market is a Moroccan market in Nouakchott, Mauritania. It is located just to the east of Mosque Marocaine.

References

Retail markets in Mauritania
Nouakchott